Miracle Mile is the third album of Christian rock band Guardian. It was recorded at the end of 1992 and released in 1993. The album was produced by the Elefante brothers, who were also producing albums for legendary Christian band Petra.

This is considered the band's most successful album to date.

Track listing
All songs written by Guardian, except where noted.
 "Dr. Jones and the Kings of Rhythm" (Bach, Rowe, Palacios) – 5:13
 "Shoeshine Johnny" – 4:15
 "Long Way Home" (Palacios, Rowe) – 4:31
 "I Found Love" (Bach, Elefante, Palacios, Rowe) – 5:24
 "Sweet Mystery" (Bach) – 3:57
 "Let It Roll" – 4:10
 "Mr. Do Wrong" – 5:02
 "Curiosity (Killed the Cat)" (Bach, Palacios, Rowe) – 4:27
 "Sister Wisdom" (Bach, Palacios, Rowe) – 4:12
 "The Captain" (Bach, George Breingan, Palacios) – 4:18
 "You & I" (Bach, Palacios, Rowe) – 4:03
 "Do You Know What Love Is" – 7:26

Personnel 
Guardian
 Jamie Rowe – lead vocals
 Tony Palacios – guitars, backing vocals
 David Bach – bass, backing vocals
 Karl Ney – drums

Guest musicians
 John Elefante – acoustic piano, organ
 Glen Hirami – accordion
 J.R. McNeely – bass
 Jamie Wollam – drums
 Ian Sabreti – percussion
 The Fabulous Martin Brothers Horns:
 Scott Martin – saxophones 
 Andy Martin – trombone 
 Stan Martin – trumpet, flugelhorn 
 Tom Howard – string arrangements and direction 
 The Orange County Wire Choir – strings
 JoJo Beiden – backing vocals
 Jameeca LaFleur – backing vocals
 Olivia McClurkin – backing vocals
 Brandon Starr – backing vocals

Production 
 John Elefante – producer, engineer 
 Dino Elefante – producer, engineer, mixing 
 Doug Beiden – engineer, mix assistant 
 J.R. McNeely – engineer 
 Gil Griffith – mix assistant 
 Chris Bellman – mastering 
 Joe Potter – art production
 David Bach – art direction, design 
 Neil Zlozower – photography 
 The Whitmore Company – management 
 Recorded and Mixed at Pakaderm Studios (Los Alamitos, California).
 Mastered at Bernie Grundman Mastering (Hollywood, California).

References

Guardian (band) albums
1992 albums